The village of Sanavardo is located approximately  east of Tbilisi, the capital and largest city of Georgia (country).

Sanavardo lies in Kakheti region. Most of the families earn their living from wine making, fruit and vegetable harvesting. There are three small shops with basic goods in the village.

See also
 Kakheti

References

Populated places in Kakheti